Rebecca Lee Carter (born 16 July 1996) is an Australian cricketer who plays as a left-handed batter and occasional right-arm medium pace bowler for the ACT Meteors in the Women's National Cricket League (WNCL). She played in one match for Melbourne Renegades in the 2020–21 WBBL season, scoring two runs. She made her WNCL debut in the 2020–21 season, scoring 62 runs in five matches.

References

External links

1996 births
Living people
Cricketers from Melbourne
Sportswomen from Victoria (Australia)
Australian women cricketers
ACT Meteors cricketers
Melbourne Renegades (WBBL) cricketers
People from the City of Knox